Arthur George Joseph "Arch" Whitehouse , M.M. was a World War I Veteran and author of World War I aviation books.

Biography
Arthur George J. Whitehouse was born in England, but lived in Montvale, New Jersey, U.S.A.
At the outbreak of World War I, Whitehouse came to England and enlisted as a Private with the Northamptonshire Yeomanry # 1784.
He then transferred to the Royal Flying Corps # 78563. He was with the Northamptonshire Yeomanry  again # 145871, then transferred to the Royal Air Force # 401090

Service
He was a 1st Class Air mechanic and Observer with the No. 22 Squadron RAF. On 13 April 1917 Whitehouse and his Pilot Bush were brought down by anti-aircraft fire; Whitehouse believed afterward that the Red Baron mistakenly listed Whitehouse/Bush among the Barons's "credits"-although this was not so. For taking part in shooting down German Aircraft and airplane raiding missions he was awarded the Military Medal with the RFC in November 1917. During the last part of World War I he was undergoing training in England as a Pilot in Sopwith Camels aircraft. As of 28 September 1919 he was a 2nd Lt transferred to the Unemployed List. A notation on his Medal card noted he was awarded the "British War Medal" and British "Victory Medal"  Contrary to reports that he brought down 16 enemy aircraft and 6 balloons, Whitehouse was never an ace, although he took part in the shooting down of four enemy aircraft:
12 August 1917-an Albatross DV {burned}; with Pilot James Bush (RFC officer) M.C. {1/3 credit share in shootdown with two other Pilots/observers}
12 August 1917-an Albatross DV {Out of Control} with Pilot James Bush (RFC officer) M.C. {1/2 credit in shootdown with another Pilot/observer} 
2 October 1917-a "Two seater" {destroyed}; with Pilot James Bush (RFC officer) M.C.
10 October 1917-a Albatross DV {Destroyed over Moorslede, Belgium} with Pilot William Meggitt, M.C.

Both Bush and Meggit were Aces with 6 credits

Author
"Arch" Whitehouse was a writer postwar for magazines such as Flying Aces (magazine) on World War I Aviation, creating characters like The Griffon, Coffin Kirk, and others.

In the 1960s, he wrote a wide range of books, both fiction and non-fiction on aviation and similar military topics.

More recently, some of his pulp fiction have been reprinted by several publishers, including Altus Press.

Books
The Adventures of Coffin Kirk (2013)
Amphibious Operations (1963)
Combat in the Sky
The Complete Adventures of the Griffon (3 volumes so far, 2010-2016)
Decisive Air Battles of the First World War
Espionage and Counterespionage: Adventures in Military Intelligence (1964)
Fighters in the Sky (1959)
Fighting Wings: aerial combat in world war (1966)
Fighting Ships
Hero without Honor
Heroes and Legends of World War I
Heroes of the Sunlit Sky (1967)
Hun Killer:Frank Luke, the Ace from Arizona (1966)
Legion of the Lafayette (1962)
Playboy Squadron {Fiction}
Scarlett Streamers
Squadron 44 (1965, fiction)
Squadron Shilling (1968, fiction)
Squadrons of the Sea: The History of Aircraft Carrier Operations (1962)
Subs and Submariners
Tank:The Story of Their Battles and the Men Who Drove Them from Their First Use (1960)
The Casket Crew
The Early Birds the Wonders and Heroics of the First Decades of Flight (1965)
The Fledgling: An Autobiography (1964)
The Military Airplane
The Military Airplane Its History and Development
The Real Book about Airplanes (1961)
The Sky's the Limit: a History of US Airlines (1971)
The Years of the Sky Kings (1964)
The Zeppelin Fighters (1966)
Wings for the Chariots
Years of the Warbirds

References

Recipients of the Military Medal
Royal Air Force personnel of World War I
Royal Air Force
1895 births
1979 deaths
British emigrants to the United States